Delkos, or Delcus, was a town of ancient Thrace. Under the name of Delcus it was a bishopric and later a titular see, now suppressed, of the Roman Catholic Church. It later called Dercos, under which name it again was a bishopric and later a titular see of the Roman Catholic Church. The Orthodox diocese remains extant (see Metropolis of Derkoi).

Its site is located near Derkoz in European Turkey.

References

Populated places in ancient Thrace
Former populated places in Turkey
Populated places of the Byzantine Empire
History of Istanbul Province